Purgan may refer to:
 Purgan, Bushehr
 Purgan, Yazd

See also
 Purkan (disambiguation)